Emmanuel von Severus OSB (24 August 1908, Vienna - 24 July 1997, Andernach) was an Austrian Benedictine.

Life
Born as Rudolf von Severus, the son of a lieutenant field marshal in the Austro-Hungarian Army, he entered Maria Laach Abbey in 1928, the year of his abitur. He was ordained a priest on 5 August 1934 and after studying Latin and history he gained his philosophy doctorate at Pater Emmanuel in 1939. From 1948 to 1990 (apart from brief interruptions) he was novice master at Maria Laach under three abbots. From 1958 to 1978 he managed the Liturgical Archive (Archiv für Liturgiewissenschaft). He also lectured on spiritual issues and wrote on scientific and spiritual topics.

External links
https://portal.dnb.de/opac.htm?method=simpleSearch&query=118764810
http://www.kreis.aw-online.de/kvar/VT/hjb1998/hjb1998.4.htm

Austrian Benedictines
Clergy from Vienna
Benedictine writers
20th-century Austrian Roman Catholic priests
1908 births
1997 deaths